Abd al-Rahman al-Jabarti (1753–1825), full name: Abd al-Rahman bin Hasan bin Burhan al-Din al-Jabarti, often simply known as Al-Jabarti, was a Somali-Egyptian scholar and historian who spent most of his life in Cairo.

Biography

Little is known of al-Jabarti's life. According to Franz Steiner, he was born in the village of Tell al-Gabarti in the northern Delta province of Beheira, Egypt. Abdulkader Saleh asserts that al-Jabarti was instead born in Cairo.

Al-Jabarti was born into a prominent family of ulama with ties to the Egyptian scholarly and political elite. Al-Jabarti's father was Hassan Al-Jabarti, a learned and highly venerated man in Cairo.  It is believed that Hassan Al-Jabarti travelled from Zeila to Cairo during the mid-18th century. Al-Jabarti's family was of ethnically Somali background. According to his writings, his name comes from his "seventh-degree grandfather," Abd al-Rahman, who was the earliest member of his family known to him. The older Abd al-Rahman was from the Jabarah (located in the Horn of Africa). 

Abd al-Rahman visited the Riwaqs of the Jabarti communities in Mecca and Medina before making it back to Egypt, where he became Sheikh of the Riwaq there.  Al-Jabarti's father was a Hanafi religious scholar and served as the director of the al-Jabarti residence hall for students at al-Azhar University, a title al-Jabarti inherited following his father's death in 1744. As a result, al-Jabarti was trained as a Sheikh at the Al-Azhar University in Cairo. Through his family ties, al-Jabarti gained access to prominent scholars al-Muradi and al-Murtada, both of whom influenced his decision to write about Egyptian history. 

He began keeping a monthly chronicle of local events, from which he compiled his three most famous works. The last and lengthiest of these documents, in Arabic Aja'ib al-athar fi al-tarajim wal-akhbar (عجائب الاَثار في التراجم والاخبار), which is generally known in English simply as Al-Jabarti's History of Egypt, and sometimes as The Marvellous Compositions of Biographies and Events, became a world-famous historical text by virtue of its eyewitness accounts of Napoleon's invasion and Muhammad Ali's seizure of power. The entries from his chronicle dealing with the French expedition and occupation have been excerpted and compiled in English as a separate volume entitled Napoleon in Egypt. He was one of the first Muslims to realise the significance of the wave of modernity that accompanied the French occupation, and the gulf that existed between Western and Islamic knowledge "shocked him profoundly".

Jabarti maintained a strict, puritanical tone in his reaction to his witnessing of the advanced military technology, material sciences and cultural values of the French occupiers. He abhorred the Republican ideas of the French revolution such as egalitarianism, liberty and equality; insisting on the supremacy of Wahy (Islamic Revelation) over European rationalism. Although he had acknowledged the advances made by Europeans in certain fields, Jabarti firmly believed in the eventual triumph of Islam over the West and advocated the restoration of Islamic prowess through his works. Expressing a strong revulsion against the French occupiers in his writings, Jabarti famously prayed for God to:"strike their tongues with dumbness … confound their intelligence, and cause their breath to cease"

Works

Al-Jabarti is known for three works: Tarikh muddat al-faransis bi-misr (The History of the Period of the French Occupation in Egypt), completed in late 1798; Mazhar al-taqdis bi-zawal dawlat al-faransis (Demonstration of Piety in the Demise of French Society), completed in December 1801; and ‘Aja’ib al-athar fi’t-tarajim wa’l-akhbar (The Marvellous Compositions of Biographies and Events), which was much longer and comprised elements from his first two works. The History of the French Occupation in Egypt chronicles the first seven months of the three-year occupation of Egypt by the French. In this work, in addition to chronicling factual events, al-Jabarti criticises the social and moral depravity of the French, embarks on an extensive correction of the grammar in the French Proclamation, and expresses general feelings of anger towards the invasion. His second work, Demonstration of Piety in the Demise of French Society, is much less well known than his other two. The Marvellous Compositions of Biographies and Events is by far al-Jabarti's most famous work, as well as his longest. This work covers the history of Egypt from 1688 to 1821 but was banned in Egypt in 1870 due to its critical views about Muhammad Ali Pasha's reforms, among other controversial criticisms. Towards the end of the 1870s the ban on his book was lifted, and it was printed in part in 1878 by the press of Alexandria newspaper Misr, and in full in 1880 by the Bulak printing press.

See also
 List of Muslim historians

References

Further reading

External links
Napoleon in Egypt : Al-Jabartī's chronicle of the French occupation, 1798, Markus Wiener Publishers, 2006
Aja'ib al-athar fi'l-tarajim wa'l-akhbar (in Arabic)
"Jabarti, Abd al-Rahman al-" in Oxford Dictionary of Islam

1756 births
1825 deaths
Somalian historians
Somalian Sunni Muslim scholars of Islam
Egyptian Sunni Muslim scholars of Islam
Egyptian people of Somali descent
Al-Azhar University alumni
Writers from Cairo
18th-century Egyptian historians
19th-century Egyptian historians
18th-century Somalian people
19th-century Somalian writers
Egyptian historians of Islam